Saracen Casino Resort is a casino in Pine Bluff, Arkansas, United States.  The first purpose-built casino in Arkansas is owned by the Quapaw Nation, and named for Saracen, a Quapaw chief in the 1800s.

History
The first section of the casino, the  Saracen Casino Annex and Q-Store, opened in September 2019, and contains 300 slot machines.

A second section, the  Saracen Casino Resort, opened across the street in 2020, and is built on a former soybean field.  Saracen Casino Resort cost $350 million to build, employed over 1,000 construction workers, and was the largest construction project in 2020 in Arkansas.  Saracen Casino Resort has 2,100 slot machines, 30 gaming tables, a poker room, a sportsbook, and eight restaurants, of which four are located in a food court called "The Post".  The casino will employ over 1,100 full-time staff, and artwork at the casino is designed "to pay homage to the Native American and African American cultures". 

A 300-room hotel, expected to be completed in 2021, will include restaurants, lounges, a spa, conference center, and a museum and cultural center.

References

Buildings and structures in Pine Bluff, Arkansas
Casinos in Arkansas
Quapaw